Chapter One: Latin America is a 1973 album by Gato Barbieri. It was recorded and issued in 1973 on Impulse! Records as AS-9248.  The album was re-released in 1997 as part of Latino America, a double CD that also included the album Chapter Two: Hasta Siempre along with unreleased tracks.

Reception
In Creem magazine, Robert Christgau said like Barbieri's previous album Bolivia, Chapter One: Latin America is a "recommended introduction to the only jazzman this side of Miles Davis to translate avant-garde into semi-popular without sounding venal". The AllMusic review awarded the album 4½ stars, stating that "this album, like its remaining chapters, makes up one of the great all but forgotten masterpieces in 1970s jazz".

Track listing
 "Encuentros" 12:28
 "India" 8:58	
 "La China Leoncia Arreo La Correntinada Trajo Entre La Muchachada La Flor De La Juventud" 13:33
 Part 1 2:28
 Part 2 2:45
 Part 3 4:32
 Part 4 3:53
"Nunca Mas" 5:25
 "To Be Continued" 2:27

All songs by Gato Barbieri, except India by J. Asunción Flores / M. Ortiz Guerrero.

Personnel
Gato Barbieri - tenor saxophone (1-5)
Raul Mercado - quena (1, 2, 3)
Amadeo Monges - Indian harp (1, 2, 3)
Ricardo Lew - Electric guitar (1, 3)
Quelo Palacios - acoustic guitar (1, 2, 3)
Isoca Fumero - charango (1, 3)
Antonio Pantoja - anapa, erke, siku, quena, erkencho (1, 2, 3)
Adalberto Cevasco - Fender bass (1, 2, 3, 4)
Dino Saluzzi - bandoneon (4)
Domingo Cura - bombo indio (Indian drums) (1, 2, 3)
Pocho Lapouble - drums (1, 3)
Jorge Padin - percussion (1, 3)
El Zurdo Roizner - percussion (1, 2, 3)
Osvaldo Bellingieri - piano (4)

References 

Gato Barbieri albums
1973 albums
Impulse! Records albums